Cédric Daniel André Charlier (born 27 November 1987) is a Belgian field hockey player who plays  as a forward for Racing Club de Bruxelles and the Belgian national team.

Club career
Charlier started playing hockey at Uccle and played there until he was 19 years old, when he went to Racing Bruxelles. In July 2019, he made a transfer to Dragons. After he won the Belgian national title with Dragons in the 2020–21 season he returned to Racing. In his first season back at Racing he won the league title again.

International career
At the 2008, 2012 and 2016 Summer Olympics, he competed for the national team in the men's tournament. At the 2016 Olympics, he was part of the Belgian men's team that won the silver medal. Charlier also won silver with Belgium at the 2013 EuroHockey Championship on home ground in Boom and at the 2017 EuroHockey Championships in Amstelveen. In 2019, he finally won a gold medal at the European championships. On 25 May 2021, he was selected in the squad for the 2021 EuroHockey Championship.

Honours

International
Belgium
Olympic gold medal: 2020
Olympic silver medal: 2016
World Cup: 2018
EuroHockey Championship: 2019
FIH Pro League: 2020–21

Club
Dragons
Belgian Hockey League: 2020–21

Racing
Belgian Hockey League: 2021–22

References

External links
 
 
 
 

1987 births
Living people
Belgian male field hockey players
Male field hockey forwards
Field hockey players at the 2008 Summer Olympics
Field hockey players at the 2012 Summer Olympics
2014 Men's Hockey World Cup players
Field hockey players at the 2016 Summer Olympics
Field hockey players at the 2020 Summer Olympics
2018 Men's Hockey World Cup players
Olympic field hockey players of Belgium
People from Anderlecht
Olympic silver medalists for Belgium
Olympic medalists in field hockey
Medalists at the 2016 Summer Olympics
KHC Dragons players
Men's Belgian Hockey League players
Royal Racing Club Bruxelles players
Olympic gold medalists for Belgium
Medalists at the 2020 Summer Olympics
Field hockey players from Brussels
2023 Men's FIH Hockey World Cup players